The Lion and His Pride is an album by saxophonist Houston Person that was released by Muse in 1994.

Track listing 
 "Dig" (Miles Davis) – 9:32
 "I Remember Clifford" (Benny Golson) – 7:33
 "Dear Heart" (Henry Mancini, Ray Evans, Jay Livingston) – 8:06
 "Sweet Love (Theme from Black Orpheus)" (Luiz Bonfá, Antônio Maria) – 6:26	
 "You Are Too Beautiful" (Richard Rodgers, Lorenz Hart) – 6:52
 "Like Someone in Love" (Jimmy Van Heusen, Johnny Burke) – 7:11	
 "Our Day Will Come" (Mort Garson, Bob Hilliard) – 4:46
 "Captain Hook" (Benny Green) – 10:06

Personnel 
Houston Person – tenor saxophone
Philip Harper – trumpet
Benny Green – piano   
Christian McBride – bass
Winard Harper – drums
Sammy Figueroa – percussion (tracks 2–8)
Etta Jones – vocals

References 

Houston Person albums
1994 albums
Muse Records albums